Stevens Park Estates is a neighborhood in Kessler, Dallas, Texas (USA), named for its developer, Dr. John H. Stevens, one of the first physicians in Dallas.  It is home to the Stevens Park Golf Course.

In 2018, Stevens Park Estates became the 20th conservation district in Dallas.

References

External links 
Stevens Park Golf Course
 Cliff Dweller Magazine